B3 is a national highway of Namibia. In South Africa the highway continues as the N10 towards Upington.

References

Roads in Namibia
Buildings and structures in ǁKaras Region